The Miri City Council (abbreviated MBM) is the city council which administers the city of Miri in the state of Sarawak, Malaysia. This council was established after the city was officially granted city status on 20 May 2005. Their jurisdiction covers an area of 997 square kilometres.

The council consists of the mayor plus twenty-eight councillors appointed to serve a one-year term by the Sarawak State Government. The purpose of this council is to upkeep infrastructure, public amenities, and facilities. In addition, the council also functions to ensure an orderly construction of buildings, safeguard public health, and beautify the environment.

History
The establishment of the Council may be traced back to the early 1930s. Miri Municipal Board was established following the enactment of Municipal Order M-7 in 1933, during the period of Kingdom of Sarawak. Resident from the 4th Division of Sarawak became the chairman of the board. Municipal officer and several community leaders also became members of the board. The operation of the Board was interrupted during Japanese Occupation of Sarawak from 1941 to 1945.

On 1 January 1956, Miri Municipal Board was reconstituted to become Miri Urban District Council, financially self-supporting and managing its own local affairs. The Council consisted of 17 nominated members.

In December 1960, Council's general election was held for the first time in Miri. The elected Council members were consolidated under Local Authority (Miri District Council) Order 1960. The new Council started its operation on 9 January 1961. The new Council was able to extend its jurisdiction to Miri sub-district. There were 18 members in the Council. Advisers of the Council include Divisional Engineer, the Superintendent of Lands and Surveys, the Divisional Medical Officer, the Divisional Education Officer and the Superintendent of Police. After the second Council general election in mid-1963, the jurisdiction of the Council covers 337 square miles (872.8 km2) with a population of 24,049, based on the 1960 Census Report.

MDC was restructured to Miri Municipal Council (MMC) in 1981 and new Councillors were sworn in on 6 November 1981. MMC had a Chairman, Deputy Chairman, and 24 Councillors. All of them were nominated members.

Miri Municipal Council was upgraded to Miri City Council when Miri was granted city status on 20 May 2005.

Appointed mayor of Miri
Since 2005, the city has been led by three mayors. The previous mayors are listed as below:

Current appointed councillors
 Robert Ayu
 Jeffery Phang Siaw Foong
 Ernest Goh Khiok Seng
 Mohamad Sardon Zainal
 Peter Chia Chhau Khiong
 Kueh Chie Tiong
 Rexsoll Gilum
 Gilbert Chin Yung Hua
 Warziedea Ahmad
 Lee Thin Hin
 Abdullah Jaini
 Ong Chee Yee
 Joanna Ping Eng Oyok
 Yap Siew Jin
 Chan Chai Ping
 Pui Yeong Fan
 Mathew Benson Mounsey
 Rantai Achin
 Leong Chin Lim
 Ariffin Mohamad
 Bhagwan Singh
 Keith Chin Hsiun
 Karambir Singh Honey
 Missiah Abdullah @ Emiss Berudi
 Aping Trang @ Connie Aping
 Dominica Lucia Tingang
 Dominic Nyurang Ajang
 David Stephen

References

External links

Miri, Malaysia
Local government in Sarawak
City councils in Malaysia